Atithi may refer to:
 Atithi Devo Bhava, meaning the Guest is equal to God as per Hindu scripture
 Atithi (1965 film), a 1965 Bengali film
 Atithee, a 1978 Hindi film
 Atithi (2002 film), a 2002 Kannada film
 Atithi (2007 film), a 2007 Telugu film
 Atithi Tum Kab Jaoge?, a 2010 Bollywood film